The Call-Air Model A is an American two- to three-seat utility aircraft designed by the Call brothers and built by the Call Aircraft Company, later developed into a successful line of agricultural aircraft.

Design and development
The Model A was designed by the Call family, who were Wyoming ranchers. The aircraft was ready to be produced in 1940 but the start of World War II delayed the start of production to 1946. The family had formed the Call Aircraft Company (known as Call-Air) to produce the aircraft. The prototype Model A was powered by a Continental A-80 engine but was redesignated the Model A-1 when re-engined with an Avco Lycoming O-235-A engine. A United States type certificate was awarded in July 1944 and the production model was designated the Model A-2. The Model A-2  was a two-seat braced low-wing monoplane with fabric-covered wooden wings and fabric-covered welded steel tube. It had a fixed tailwheel landing gear. Further models were introduced with different engines. Examples of the three-seat A-4 were converted for agricultural use followed by a new-build agricultural version the A-5. In 1962 the assets of the company were acquired at auction by the Intermountain Manufacturing Company (IMCO) who developed their own version the IMCO CallAir A-9. IMCO was later taken over by the Aero Commander division of the Rockwell Standard Corporation and later became part of North American Rockwell, the design was further developed and redesignated.

Variants
A
Continental A-80-engined prototype, one built converted to A-1
A-1
Re-engined with an Avco Lycoming O-235-a engine, four built and prototype converted.
A-2
Two-seat cabin monoplane production version powered by an Avco Lycoming O-290-a engine, 16 built.
A-3
125 hp (93 kw) Continental C-125-2-powered version, 15 built.
A-4
Two/three-seat cabin monoplane version powered by a 135 hp (101 kw) Avco Lycoming O-290-D2 engine, 65 built.
A-5
Open-cockpit two-seat agricultural version of the A-4, 74 built.
A-5T Texan
A-5 with revised fuselage structure, nine built.
A-6
Improved version of A-5 with Avco Lycoming O-360-A1A engine, 34 built.
A-7
Similar to A-5 powered by West Coast Dusting-built Continental W-670-240 engine. One converted from an A-6
A-7T
Proposed development of A-7 with higher gross weight

Specifications (A-2)

References

Further reading

External links

Vintage Aircraft Museum

1940s United States civil utility aircraft
Low-wing aircraft
Single-engined tractor aircraft
Aircraft first flown in 1940